This is a list of the radio episodes of the British sitcom Dad's Army which were normally adapted from the script of an earlier television episode. Dates shown are for the recording session followed by the original transmission on BBC Radio 4. Since 2007, the full run of radio episodes has been regularly repeated on digital archive station BBC Radio 4 Extra along with its radio-only sequel It Sticks Out Half a Mile.

Although most of the television episodes were adapted to radio, the following were not: Gorilla Warfare, Ring Dem Bells, When You've Got to Go, Come in, Your Time is Up, The Face on the Poster, My Brother and I, The Love of Three Oranges, Wake Up Walmington, The Making of Private Pike, Knights of Madness, The Miser's Hoard, Number Engaged and Never Too Old.

Series 1

Christmas Special

Series 2

Series 3

References

External links

See also

Dad's Army
Lists of British radio series episodes